According to the New Testament book of Romans, Tertius of Iconium (also Tertios) acted as an amanuensis for Paul the Apostle, writing down his Epistle to the Romans. He is numbered among the Seventy Disciples in a list pseudonymously attributed to Hippolytus of Rome, which is found in the margin of several ancient manuscripts. 

According to tradition, Tertius was Bishop in Iconium after the Apostle Sosipater and died a martyr. The Catholic Church marks St. Tertius days on October 30 and November 10.

Hymns
Troparion (Tone 3)   
Holy Apostles,  Erastus, Olympas, Herodian, Sosipater, Quartus and Tertius,
entreat the merciful God,
to grant our souls forgiveness of transgressions.

Kontakion (Tone 2)
Illumined by divine light, O holy apostles,
you wisely destroyed the works of idolatry.
When you caught all the pagans you brought them to the Master
and taught them to glorify the Trinity.

Sources
St. Nikolai Velimirovic, The Prologue from Ohrid

References

External links
 Apostle Tertius of the Seventy, October 30 (OCA)
 Apostle Tertius of the Seventy, November 10 (OCA)
 Erastos, Olympas, Herodion, Sosipatros, Quartus, Tertios, Apostles of the 70 (GOARCH)
 The Holy Apostles Cleopas, Tertius, Mark, Justus and Artemas (Prologue of Ohrid, October 30)
 The Holy Apostles Olympas, Erastus, Quartus, Herodion, Sosipater and Tertius (Prologue of Ohrid, November 10)

1st-century bishops in Roman Anatolia
1st-century Christian martyrs
Amanuenses
Christian saints from the New Testament
People in the Pauline epistles
Seventy disciples
Saints from Roman Anatolia